Scutellosaurus is a genus of thyreophoran ornithischian dinosaur that lived approximately 196 million years ago during the early part of the Jurassic Period in what is now Arizona, USA. It is classified in Thyreophora, the armoured dinosaurs; its closest relatives may have been Emausaurus and Scelidosaurus, another armored dinosaur which was mainly a quadrupedal dinosaur, unlike bipedal Scutellosaurus. It is one of the earliest representatives of the armored dinosaurs and the basalmost form discovered to date.

Etymology

The genus name Scutellosaurus means "little-shielded lizard", and is derived from the Latin word "scutellum" meaning "little shield", and the Greek word "sauros" (σαύρα) meaning "lizard". The type and only valid species known today is Scutellosaurus lawleri. The specific name honors David Lawler who collected the fossil.

Description

Scutellosaurus was lightly built, and was probably capable of walking on its hind legs. It had an unusually long tail, possibly to provide a counterbalance against the weight of the armored body. The fossil evidence includes several partial skeletons recovered from Arizona by the Museum of Northern Arizona and the University of California Museum of Paleontology, although the skull is poorly known from these specimens. There were several hundred osteoderms running along its neck to its back and as far down as its tail. These formed parallel rows, with as many as five rows on each side. It also had double rows of osteoderms, or external plates, running neck to tail. Some of these shields were flat, while others were pitted.

Discovery and occurrence

The holotype specimen of Scutellosaurus lawleri (MNA.V.175) was recovered at the West Moenkopi Plateau locality in the Silty Facies Member of the Kayenta Formation, in Coconino County, Arizona on the land of the Navajo Nation. The specimen was discovered and collected by David Lawler in red claystone sediments that were deposited during the Sinemurian stage of the Jurassic period, approximately 196 million years ago.

The holotype specimen was described by Edwin Colbert (1981) based on the following: partially preserved premaxillae with teeth, a right maxilla with seven teeth, a left maxilla with five teeth, dentaries that are missing their posterior portions, a left dentary with 18 teeth, a right dentary with 10 teeth, other skull fragments, 21 presacral vertebral centra, several complete and partial neural arches and spines, five sacral vertebrae, 58 caudal vertebrae with neural arches and several chevrons, several incomplete ribs, both scapulae, both coracoids, partially preserved ilia, fragments of the pubic bones and of the ischia, both humeri, the distal end of the right radius, the proximal and distal ends of the left radius and ulna, fragments of the manus, both femora, the right tibia, the proximal end of the right fibula, the right astragalus, the left tibia, the left fibula, various bones of the pedes, including a possible distal tarsal bone, and over 300 osteoderms.

References

Early Jurassic dinosaurs of North America
Thyreophorans
Fossil taxa described in 1981
Taxa named by Edwin H. Colbert
Paleontology in Arizona
Kayenta Formation
Ornithischian genera